Lake Milh (literally Sea of Salt, pronounced Bahr al-Milh), also known as Razzaza Lake, is located a few miles west of Karbala, Iraq. It is alternately called Lake Razazah. Lake Milh is a depression into which excess water from Lake Habbaniyah, which comes from the Euphrates River, is diverted through a controlled escape channel or canal. The lake is listed as a wetland of international importance. The lake is rather shallow and water levels change with the seasons. Due to the salts and the changing water levels, this largest freshwater lake in Iraq has lost its important stock of fish species and only a few recreational areas exist around the lake.

Geography

The lake, also termed as "Kerbala Gap” has a large expanse of  enclosed by deserts with a few low hills on the shore line. It is a deep closed lake in a sand/silt basin. The lake's western part of the valley has thick forest cover, apart from orchards. In the eastern and southern parts, the terrain is of flat arid/semi-desert type. Mud flats are a common feature in the lake.

The geological formation in and around the lake consists of marls, siltstones, gypsum/anhydrite, and limestone bands, but mostly silts.

History
The lake was constructed during the latter half of the 1970s, below the Haur Al Habbaniya as a flood control measure to regulate the flood flows in the Euphrates River.

Features
The lake is fed from the excess flood flows diverted from the Majora escape of the Habbaniya Lake. The flow from the escape is diverted through the Sin-Al-Thibban Canal, which is a narrow channel that is aligned through a semi-desert area. This diversion prevents flooding in the northern areas. The salinity of the lake is increasing as result of inadequate supply of water from the link canal. According to a USGS study of Landsat imagery of the area it is noted that the water level of the shallow lake fluctuates with the seasons, and in recent years of 1995, 2003, and 2013 the area of the lake has reduced considerably. The local people said that the water depth in the lake was reduced to about  since 1993, during the regime of Saddam Hussein. The reason for this reduction in area is mainly due to inadequate diversion of water from Habbaniya Lake, where the priority of use is irrigation. Diversion has been limited to once in 15 days only. This has also affected fishing operations in the lake which in the past used to be throughout the year. As a result, the only fish species surviving in the lake is reported to be "al-Shanik"
or Shanak, (Acanthopagrus cf. arabicus) of marine origin, stocked in the lake by the government. During the Gulf War the area was a military establishment.

Vegetation
The vegetation around the periphery of the lake consists of Aeluropus lagapoides, Juncus acutus, Phragmites australis,  Salicornia herbacea, and Schoenoplectus littoralis. Also reported are shrub-lands made up of desert species of Haloxylon salicornicum, Nitraria retusa, Prosopis farcta, Tamarix aucherana, Tamarix macrocarpa, and Zygophyllum fabago.

Fauna
The lake area has a large number of wintering waterfowl. Some of the species reported are Marmaronetta angustirostris, Podiceps cristatus, Podiceps nigricollis, Phalacrocorax carbo, Pelecanus onocrotalus, Mergellus albellus and Fulica atra. According to a survey 42 bird species have been recorded.

The mammal species reported are the: Rüppell's fox (Vulpes rueppellii), golden jackal (Canis aureus), Indian grey mongoose (Urva edwardsii), jungle cat (Felis chaus), and wild cat (Felis silvestris).

See also
Lake Tharthar
Lake Habbaniyah
Lake Qadisiyah
List of dams and reservoirs in Iraq
Mosul Dam
Wildlife of Iraq

References

Bibliography

Milh
Milh